Lake Bütgenbach is an artificial lake created by the damming of the Warche river in 1932. It is located in East Belgium near the village of Bütgenbach in Ardennes (High Fens), Belgium. The lake is not far from the border of Germany.

It is a popular tourist attraction, with water sports, including kayaking and windsurfing.

References

 Website of the municipality of Bütgenbach
 

RBütgenbach
Reservoirs in Belgium
Lakes of the Ardennes (Belgium)
Lakes of Liège Province
Lake Butgenbach
Reservoirs in the Eifel